Paraná is the capital city of the Argentine province Entre Ríos, located on the eastern shore of the Paraná River, opposite the city of Santa Fe, capital of the neighbouring Santa Fe Province. The city has a population of 247,863.

History
During the 16th century, inhabitants of the city of Santa Fe settled at the other shore of the Paraná river. The first settlers called it “Baxada del Paraná”.

Between 1854 and 1861 it was the capital city of the Argentine Confederation.

Economy
Paraná is not only the head of the provincial government, but also an important river port for the transshipment of cereals, cattle, fish, and lumber from the surrounding region. The principal industries installed are the manufacture of cement, furniture, and ceramics.

Cityscape
The centre of the city gathers colonial churches, European styles such as that of the 3 de Febrero Theatre or the Government House, the mixed styles of the city's Cathedral, and modern towers like those near the Parque Urquiza park. The city is connected to the city of Santa Fe on the other side of the Entre Ríos by the Hernandarias Subfluvial Tunnel inaugurated in 1969.

Transport
Paraná is served by General Justo José de Urquiza Airport (IATA PRA), at coordinates ,  from the city, with regular flights to Buenos Aires (Aeroparque Jorge Newbery). Another option is Sauce Viejo Airport in nearby Santa Fe.

Climate
Paraná has a Pampean climate, which under the Köppen climate classification, would be classified as a humid subtropical climate (Cfa). Winters are characterized with mild temperatures during the day and very cold nights. Temperatures occasionally fall below , leading to frosts.

Spring and Fall are transitional seasons with warm temperatures during the day with cool temperatures during the night. Normally, the last frost occurs on August 4 although frosts can occur as late as October 9. The first frost occurs on June 22 though frosts as early as May has occurred.

Summers are characterized by hot weather during the day with mild to warm nights. The average temperature during summer is around  although heat waves can push temperatures above  while cool Pampero winds can push temperatures below . The city, along with the entire province is located in an area of high risk of tornadoes in the country, particularly during spring and summer.

Paraná receives  of precipitation per year, most of it concentrated in the summer months and there are 87 days with measurable precipitation. The average relative humidity is 73%. Paraná receives an average of 2713.3 hours (or 61% of possible sunshine) of bright sunshine per year, ranging from a low of 51% in June to a high of 67% in January and February.

Sports
The city is home to the basketball team Atlético Echagüe. As of 2017, it competes in the Liga Nacional de Básquet, Argentina's top professional basketball division. It plays its home games at the Estadio Luis Butta. The main football teams are: Club Atlético Patronato and Club Atlético Paraná.

Gallery

Sister cities 
 Salto, Uruguay
 Santa Cruz de la Sierra, Bolivia
 Muscatine, United States
 Quebec City, Canada
 Leonforte, Italy

Notable residents 
Salvador Maciá (1855-1929), Governor of Entre Ríos Province
Martin Castrogiovanni (born 1981), Italy international rugby player born in the city

References

External links
Official website 

Universidad Nacional de Entre Ríos 

 
Cities in Argentina
Capitals of Argentine provinces
Populated places established in the 16th century
Populated places in Entre Ríos Province
Paraná River
Entre Ríos Province
Argentina